Peter Ó Maolmhuaidh was appointed Dean of Armagh in 1487 and deprived in 1492.  At some point he was restored and died in 1505.

References

Deans of Armagh
15th-century Irish Roman Catholic priests
16th-century Irish Roman Catholic priests
Year of birth unknown
1505 deaths